The Ontario Mark 3 Navy (MKIII) is the standard knife for the US Navy and Navy SEALs.

History and Durability

The Mark 3 was officially adopted by some units in the United States around 1970, and was also sold for general sale. However, due to the obsolescence, it is no longer used because it is no longer able to meet the requirements of the US. It features a 6" 440 stainless steel blade. It has a saw tooth back and a black oxide finish, with high impact plastic handle and sheath. The original had a steep counter curved point which the Navy requested be reinforced because of damage to the tip of the blade when prying. They have since reinforced the tip eliminating the reverse curve making the point more sturdy. People have found many uses for this knife, including using the butt as a hammer and the blade as a prybar which may cause personal harm. The blade is said to hold a great edge and be very durable.

Usage
Apart from the USA, Mark 3 knife is issued to officers of Special Duties Unit and Counter Terrorism Response Unit of the Hong Kong Police Force.

Users
 

Military knives
Equipment of the United States Navy